Robert Stuart may refer to:
Robert Stuart (British Army officer) (c. 1812–1901), British Army officer and veteran of the Crimean War
Robert Stuart (explorer) (1785–1848), Scottish-born American fur trader
Robert Stuart, Duke of Kintyre and Lorne (1602–1602), fifth child of James VI of Scots and Anne of Denmark
Robert Stuart (businessman) (1852–1926), co-founder of the Quaker Oats Company
Robert L. Stuart (1806–1882), American businessman and philanthropist
R. Douglas Stuart (1886–1975), United States businessman and United States Ambassador to Canada 
R. Douglas Stuart Jr. (1916–2014), Quaker Oats heir and founder of the 1940 America First Committee
Bobby Stuart (1913–1987), footballer

See also
Bob Stuart (1920–2005), rugby union player
Bob Stuart (rugby) (1887–1959), dual-code rugby player

Robert Stewart (disambiguation)